Diego Armando Brizuela Jara (born 15 December 1988) is a Paraguayan former footballer who played as a forward.

He played for Willy Serrato of the Peruvian Segunda División.

References
 
 

1987 births
Living people
Paraguayan footballers
Association football forwards
Club Sportivo San Lorenzo footballers
Silvio Pettirossi footballers
Club Atlético 3 de Febrero players
Magallanes footballers
Primera B de Chile players
Peruvian Segunda División players
Paraguayan expatriate footballers
Paraguayan expatriate sportspeople in Chile
Expatriate footballers in Chile
Paraguayan expatriate sportspeople in Peru
Expatriate footballers in Peru